Alexander Sergeivich Famitsin (Russian: Александр Сергеевич Фаминцын) (1841-1896) was a renowned Russian musical writer, critic and musicologist, professor at Saint Petersburg Conservatory, pupil of Ignaz Moscheles, Moritz Hauptmann and Ernst Richter and friend of Alexander Serov.

Life 
Alexander Sergeivich, of aristocratic descent, was born at Kalouga, Oct. 24 (O.S.), 1841. He was educated in St. Petersburg, and on leaving the University spent two years in Leipzig, where he studied theory under Hauptmann, Richter, and Moscheles. On his return to Russia he was appointed professor of musical history and aesthetics at the newly opened Conservatoire. He resigned in 1872, in order to devote himself to composition. As a critic he made himself notorious by his attacks upon the new national school of music. A.F. Famintsin was one of the commission members in the deceleration of independence of Ukrainian language in 1906.

Works

Operas 
Famitsin composed two weak but pretentious operas: Sardanapalus, given in St. Petersburg in 1875, but with so little success that he made no effort to produce his second opera, Uriel Acosta. His instrumental works include three quartets, a pianoforte quintet, and a 'Russian Rhapsody' for violin and orchestra.

Books 
Two books of 'Songs for Russian Children' have outlived his more ambitious attempts. As a musical antiquary he did his best work in the following publications:

 Russian Mummers and Gleemen (1889)
 The Ancient Indo-Chinese Scale in Europe and Asia
 Russian Folk-Songs (1890)
 The Gussies: a Russian National Instrument (1890)
 The Dombra and Kindred Instruments (1891).

References

Attribution

People from Kaluga
Russian nobility